Webster University is a private university with its main campus in Webster Groves, Missouri. It has multiple branch locations across the United States and countries across Europe, Asia, and Africa. In 2021, Webster enrolled 6,741 students. The university has an alumni network of around 170,000 graduates worldwide.

History
It was founded in 1915 by the Sisters of Loretto as Loretto College, a Catholic women's college, one of the first west of the Mississippi River. One of the early founders was Mother Praxedes Carty. The college's name was changed to Webster College in 1924. The first male students were admitted in 1962. The sisters transferred ownership of the college to a lay Board of Directors in 1967; it was the first Catholic college in the United States to be totally under lay control. In 1983, Webster College's name was changed to Webster University.

Webster was involved in the early racial integration battles in St. Louis. During the early 1940s, many local priests, especially the Jesuits, challenged the segregationist policies at the city's Catholic colleges and parochial schools. The St. Louis chapter of the Midwest Clergy Conference on Negro Welfare arranged in 1943 for Webster College to admit a black female student, Mary Aloyse Foster, which would make it the city's first Catholic college to integrate. However, in 1943 Archbishop John J. Glennon blocked that student's enrollment by speaking privately with the Kentucky-based Superior General of the Sisters of Loretto. The Pittsburgh Courier, an African-American newspaper with national circulation, discovered Glennon's actions and ran a front-page feature on the Webster incident in February 1944. The negative publicity toward Glennon's segregationist policies led Saint Louis University to begin admitting African American students in summer 1944. In the fall of 1945, Webster College responded to pressure by admitting Irene Thomas, a Catholic African-American woman from St. Louis, as a music major.

Academics

Colleges include the College of Humanities & Social Sciences, College of Health and Science, the Leigh Gerdine College of Fine Arts, the George Herbert Walker School of Business & Technology, the School of Communications, and the School of Education.

Webster University is accredited by the Higher Learning Commission. Specific programs are accredited by specialized accreditors, including the Association of Collegiate Business Schools and Programs (ACBSP), the National Association of Schools of Music (NASM), the National League for Nursing (NLN), the Council on Accreditation (COA), the National Council for Accreditation of Teacher Education (NCATE), the Missouri Department of Elementary and Secondary Education, and the National Board for Certified Counselors.

In 2023, Webster University was ranked 22nd among regional universities (Midwest) by U.S. News & World Report.

Campus

Webster University's home campus is located in Webster Groves, a suburb of St. Louis.  Many of the domestic campuses are located near military bases; some are located in various metropolitan areas. The international campuses are located in several European countries including Switzerland, Austria, Georgia, and The Netherlands; several are also located in Asia and Africa, such as in Thailand, Ghana and China.

In addition to its own international campuses, Webster has also formed partnerships with a few universities that are based in the country of interest. For example, The Webster Graduate School was until 2015 tied with Regent's University London; and Webster maintains a relationship with Kansai University in Osaka, Japan and with The Universidad Autónoma de Guadalajara in Guadalajara, Mexico. Recently, Webster started a study abroad program in Greece.

In 2015, Webster released a report on its Thailand campus citing several issues, including badly inadequate facilities and a culture of distrust between students and the administration. The report also cited several strengths on the campus, including strong academics and financial stability, saying "recruitment, marketing and admissions" are an area of strength for the campus. One month after the internal report was issued, a campus ombudsman was appointed to address the communications issues and to bring the Thailand campus more in-line with the home campus' policies.

Athletics
Webster University's athletic mascot is the Gorlok, named in honor of the school's location at the corner of Gore and Lockwood Avenues in Webster Groves. Athletic teams participate in the NCAA Division III and in the St. Louis Intercollegiate Athletic Conference (SLIAC).

 Men's sports: baseball; basketball; cross country; golf; soccer; tennis; and, track and field
 Women's sports: basketball; cross country; soccer; softball; tennis; track and field; and, volleyball
Webster's Baseball Team has made back to back trips to the Division III World Series placing fifth in both 2012 and 2013.  They also made the Division III World Series in 2015. They made it to the regional Division III championship in 2014 but was defeated in the first round. Major League pitcher Josh Fleming played for Webster.

Webster's chess team has won more national titles than any college team in the country and has been ranked #1 continuously since 2012.

Student life
Webster University, in Fall 2014, enrolled 5,010 undergraduate students and 17,190 graduate students. The average SAT composite score for the undergraduate class was 1,194. The average ACT composite score was 24. Students come from 49 states and more than 122 countries.

Webster University St. Louis has a student newspaper called The Journal and a student radio station called The Galaxy. The Galaxy was re-launched online in 2007. Webster University has other e-newsletters such as Webster Today and departmental publications.

Webster University recently allowed the formation of the first Greek organization on its St. Louis campus, with the founding of the 152nd Chapter of Delta Upsilon and the founding of the Gamma Zeta Chapter of Delta Phi Epsilon.

Notable people

Faculty

Professors for the university have included Chess grandmaster Susan Polgar, actor/dancer Lara Teeter, dancer Alicia Graf Mack, poet David Clewell, video artist Van McElwee, political scientists Daniel Hellinger and Johannes Pollak,  United Nations Special Rapporteur for Violence Against Women Rashida Manjoo, activist and writer Sulak Sivaraksa, sound engineer Bill Porter, Holocaust scholar Harry J. Cargas, and former Missouri Governor Bob Holden.

Alumni

Alumni include four-time Academy Award nominee actress Marsha Mason, television, screen and stage actress Jenifer Lewis,
Tony Award-winning actor Norbert Leo Butz and multiple Tony Award-winning choreographer and director Jerry Mitchell, as well as actor and cabaret artist Nathan Lee Graham;
William Broad, Pulitzer Prize winning reporter for The New York Times; comedian, television star and sports commentator Rob Riggle; John Boccieri, former U.S. Congressman;
Ann Walsh Bradley, Wisconsin State Supreme Court Justice;
JD Leathers, American polymath and politician, former traffic commissioner and public policy advisor, 2022 Democrat candidate for Missouri's Fourth Congressional District; 
Lloyd James Austin III, 28th and current United States Secretary of Defense; Army 41 year retired four star general;
Bronze Star recipient, United States Army veteran of Afghan and Iraq conflicts and West Virginia state senator Richard Ojeda;
Clarence Harmon, former Mayor and Chief of Police for St. Louis;
Roderick Royal, former Mayor of Birmingham, Alabama;
Indonesian President Susilo Bambang Yudhoyono;
R. Alan King, military veteran (Panama and Iraq) and author of Twice Armed: An American Soldier's Battle for Hearts and Minds in Iraq – Winner of 2008 William E. Colby Award;
Debra Drexler, painter, installation artist, curator;
Sandra Mansour, fashion designer;
Kathy Mazzarella, chairman, president and CEO of Graybar, one of only 23 female CEOs of Fortune 500 companies nationwide;
Three-time Emmy Awardee, Leyna Nguyen, KCAL9 news anchor, Los Angeles;
Mary Alice Dwyer-Dobbin, television producer;
Poet and arts educator Jane Ellen Ibur;
Astronauts Col. Sidney M. Gutierrez and Eileen Collins.
Chess grandmasters Wesley So, Ray Robson and Liem Le.

There were over 190,000 alumni as of 2017.

References

External links

Official athletics website

 
Sisters of Loretto schools
Universities and colleges in St. Louis County, Missouri
Universities and colleges in Louisville, Kentucky
Educational institutions established in 1915
Former Catholic universities and colleges in the United States
1915 establishments in Missouri
Buildings and structures in St. Louis County, Missouri
Private universities and colleges in Kentucky
Private universities and colleges in Missouri
International universities
Universities and colleges accredited by the Higher Learning Commission